Gribanovsky (masculine), Gribanovskaya (feminine), or Gribanovskoye (neuter) is the name of several inhabited localities in Russia.

Urban localities
Gribanovsky (urban-type settlement), an urban-type settlement in Gribanovsky District of Voronezh Oblast

Rural localities
Gribanovskaya, Krasnoborsky District, Arkhangelsk Oblast, a village in Belosludsky Selsoviet of Krasnoborsky District of Arkhangelsk Oblast
Gribanovskaya, Onezhsky District, Arkhangelsk Oblast, a village in Kokorinsky Selsoviet of Onezhsky District of Arkhangelsk Oblast
Gribanovskaya, Kirov Oblast, a village in Ichetovkinsky Rural Okrug of Afanasyevsky District of Kirov Oblast
Gribanovskaya, Leningrad Oblast, a village in Vinnitskoye Settlement Municipal Formation of Podporozhsky District of Leningrad Oblast